Royal Alexandra Hospital may refer to:

Royal Alexandra Children's Hospital, Brighton, England
Royal Alexandra Hospital (Edmonton), Canada
Royal Alexandra Hospital for Children, Sydney, Australia
Royal Alexandra Hospital, Paisley, Scotland
Royal Alexandra Hospital, Rhyl, Wales

See also 
RAF Princess Alexandra Hospital, Wroughton, England